James Edgar Rutledge (born August 26, 1959) is a Canadian professional golfer who currently plays on the Champions Tour.

Rutledge was born in Victoria, British Columbia. He won the Canadian Juvenile Championship in 1975 at the Gorge Vale Golf Club in Victoria and the Canadian Junior Championship in 1977. He turned professional in 1978. For the first 20 years of his career, Rutledge would play in Asia in the winter and in Canada for the rest of the year. He did not do this from 1988 to 1992 though. During that time Rutledge was a member of the European Tour, where his best finish on the Order of Merit came in 1990 when he finished in 55th, earning £75,274. He played in his first major at the 1990 Open Championship, where he was high on the leaderboard going into the weekend, but ended up finishing T-57. He played in his second and last major the following year at the 1991 Open Championship but he missed the cut. Rutledge's best finish on the Asia Golf Circuit Order of Merit was third in 1994 and 1995. He has finished third on the Canadian Tour's Order of Merit three times. He is one of the winningest players in Canadian Tour history, winning six times on tour.

Rutledge was a member of the Nationwide Tour between 2001 and 2009, except for 2007 when he was a member of the PGA Tour. Rutledge's first Nationwide Tour win in 2006 at the ING New Zealand PGA Championship, helped him finish in 14th on the money list, which earned him his PGA Tour card for 2007. As the second oldest rookie in the history of the PGA Tour, he was not able to retain his tour card. Rutledge only made 5 of 23 cuts, with his best finish coming at the Mayakoba Golf Classic at Riviera Maya-Cancun where he finished T-31. He does not play in Asia anymore but still plays on the Canadian Tour.

After turning 50 on August 26, 2009, Rutledge has made several appearances on the Champions Tour, with some success. He earned conditional exempt status for the 2011 Champions Tour season, by finishing eighth at the final qualifying school tournament on November 19, 2010. Only the top five players in that event gained full status for 2011. He fully qualified for the 2012 Champions Tour after finishing tied for second at qualifying school in 2011.

Amateur wins
1975 Canadian Juvenile Championship
1977 Canadian Junior Championship

Professional wins (9)

PGA Tour of Australasia wins (1)

1Co-sanctioned by the Nationwide Tour

Nationwide Tour wins (1)

1Co-sanctioned by the PGA Tour of Australasia

Asia Golf Circuit wins (1)

Canadian Tour wins (6)

Other wins (1)
2000 Niagara Classic

Results in major championships

CUT = missed the half-way cut
"T" = tied
Note: Rutledge only played in The Open Championship.

Canadian national team appearances
World Cup: 1984, 1995, 2006
Dunhill Cup: 1993, 1996

See also
2006 Nationwide Tour graduates

References

External links

Article from Sports Illustrated

Canadian male golfers
Asian Tour golfers
European Tour golfers
PGA Tour golfers
PGA Tour Champions golfers
Korn Ferry Tour graduates
Golfing people from British Columbia
1959 births
Living people